ATI Inc. (previously Allegheny Technologies Incorporated) is an American producer of specialty materials, the company is headquartered in Dallas, Texas.

ATI produces titanium and titanium alloys, nickel-based alloys and superalloys, stainless and specialty steels, zirconium, hafnium, and niobium, tungsten materials, forgings and castings.

ATI's key markets are aerospace and defense particularly commercial jet engines (over 50% of sales), oil & gas, chemical process industry, electrical energy, and medical.

The company's plants in Western Pennsylvania include facilities in Harrison Township (Allegheny Ludlum's Brackenridge Works), Vandergrift, and Washington. The company also has plants in: Illinois; Indiana; Ohio; Kentucky; California; South Carolina; Oregon; Alabama; Texas; Connecticut; Massachusetts; North Carolina; Wisconsin; New York; Shanghai, China; and several facilities in Europe.

Its titanium sponge plants are located in Albany, Oregon and Rowley, Utah. In total, ATI was said to have capacity for 40 million pounds per annum.

History
In 1939, the merger of Allegheny Steel of Pittsburgh and Ludlum Steel of Watervliet, New York created Allegheny Ludlum Corporation; prior to the merger, the companies had manufactured steel for the Chrysler Building and Empire State Building in New York City. Allegheny Steel had produced stainless steel brightwork for the Model A Ford starting in 1930

Through the 1970s, Allegheny Ludlum periodically cooperated with Ford to build several one-off promotional cars with stainless steel bodies. Three such cars are on display in the Crawford Auto-Aviation Museum.

In 1978, the company acquired Wilkinson Sword and Scripto.

Scripto was sold to the Tokai Corporation of Japan in 1984.

In 1986, the company suffered a $198 million operating loss and chairman Robert Buckley, stepped down amid accusations of mismanagement. In 1987, Wilkinson Sword was sold to Swedish Match for $230 million.

In 1987, Allegheny Ludlum became a public company via an initial public offering under chief executive Dick Simmons

In 1993, the company acquired Jessop Steel.

In 1996, it merged with Teledyne to form Allegheny Technologies. The company then spun off several subsidiaries as independent public companies such as Teledyne Technologies and Water Pik Technologies in 1999, to concentrate on its core business of metal and alloy production.

In 1998, the company acquired certain assets of Lukens Washington Steel when it was sold to Bethlehem Steel.

In 2004, the company acquired J&L Specialty Steel.

In 2005, the company sold its World Minerals subsidiary to French company Imerys.

In 2010, the company acquired Ladish for $778 million.

Allegheny Technologies debuted its ATI 425 Titanium Alloy on June 14, 2010, at the land and air-land defense and security exhibition Eurosatory in Paris, France.

In March 2021, about 1,300 workers at nine facilities in the northern United States, all members of the United Steelworkers, went on strike over proposed changes to their health care plans. The strike ended in July with the company rejecting its proposed changes.

In June 2022, the company was officially renamed from Allegheny Technologies Incorporated to ATI. Alongside this, the company's domain was changed from ATImetals.com to ATImaterials.com.

Products 
The company organizes its products into two segments:
 High Performance Materials & Components, which includes titanium-based alloys, nickel-based alloys and superalloys, zirconium and hafnium.
 Advanced Alloys & Solutions, which includes zirconium-, hafnium-, and niobium-based alloys, titanium and titanium alloys, nickel-based alloys, specialty alloys, duplex alloys in sheet, strip, and plate form, grain-oriented electrical steel.

Environmental record
Allegheny Ludlum's Natrona, Pennsylvania and Brackenridge, Pennsylvania plants contributed to the waste at the ALSCO Park Lindane Dump, an EPA Superfund site. These plants also released chromium into the air, which adversely affected air quality at schools in the Highlands School District.

In 2005, Allegheny Ludlum agreed to pay a $2,375,000 penalty to settle a lawsuit brought by the U.S. Department of Justice on behalf of the United States Environmental Protection Agency in 1995, which alleged that the company had unlawfully discharged oil and other pollutants, such as chromium, zinc, copper, and nickel, into the Allegheny River and Kiskiminetas River in the suburbs of Pittsburgh.

Carbon footprint
ATI reported Total CO2e emissions (Direct + Indirect) for 31 December 2020 at 407 Kt (-146 /-26.4% y-o-y).

References

External links

Manufacturing companies based in Pittsburgh
Manufacturing companies established in 1996
Companies listed on the New York Stock Exchange
Metal companies of the United States
Teledyne Technologies
1996 establishments in Pennsylvania
American companies established in 1996